The murder of Shalhevet Pass was a shooting attack carried out in Hebron, West Bank, on 26 March 2001, in which a Palestinian sniper killed 10-month-old Israeli infant Shalhevet Pass. The event shocked the Israeli public, partly because an investigation ruled that the sniper had deliberately aimed for the baby. According to Deborah Sontag of the New York Times, the murder became a "potent Israeli symbol as an innocent victim of the raging violence."

The murder
At 4:00 pm on 26 March 2001, Shalhevet was shot in her stroller while accompanied by her parents from a parking lot by Hebron's Avraham Avinu neighborhood, where the family lived.

After a ten-minute lull, the Palestinian sniper resumed firing from the Abu Sneinah neighborhood on the hill opposite. Shalhevet was killed instantly; her mother grabbed her when she heard the gunshots, only to discover that the baby was already dead. One of the sniper's bullets penetrated the baby's head, passing through her skull, and hit her father as well. Shalhevet's father, Yitzchak Pass, a student, who had been pushing the stroller, was also seriously wounded minutes later by two bullets.

Press accounts indicated that the playground was very busy at the time, because a load of new sand had recently been delivered. According to unconfirmed accounts, another child was grazed by a bullet and two more had bullets pass through their clothing.

Aftermath

The murder, which occurred during the Second Intifada, produced vocal outrage in Israel and abroad. The nation mourned the killing of the baby.

Prime Minister Ariel Sharon condemned the attack and sent his condolences to the Pass family. Sharon also stated that he saw the Palestinian Authority as responsible for the attack. The Jewish community in Hebron demanded that the Israel Defense Forces (IDF) reoccupy the Abu Sneineh neighborhood, and the Pass family even stated that they would not bury their baby until the IDF did so.

Capture and trial of killer
The Palestinian Authority initially arrested the sniper, but released him after a short while. On 9 December 2002 the Shin Bet managed to capture the sniper—Tanzim member Mahmud Amru. In December 2004, a military court convicted the killer and sentenced him to three life terms.

According to the Israeli government, an investigation concluded that the sniper had intentionally targeted the baby. A spokesperson for Prime Minister Ariel Sharon said: The fact that they could pick off the baby and then the father makes this a hideous, deliberate, cold-blooded murder. Snipers are not just gun-toting youth.... If Arafat had wanted, the sniper would not have been there.

In the verdict the judges expressed their shock of the brutality of the murder:It was enough for one bullet, fired from a sniper rifle, to end the life of the infant Shalhevet Pass, who up to that event was unknown to the wide public, and just lived her life as all other children, until one day as the evening came she was hit in her head, and she died, and Shalhevet whom was still small and in her infant stage, was sentenced to death by a vile killer whom intentionally, using a Telescopic sight, pulled the trigger. The picture of the shot baby is on our table, is engraved in our minds and does not give peace to our souls. We cannot understand and we cannot accept the unbearable ease with which the killer decided to harm a helpless person.... We the judges are only humans and we cannot see anything else but the image which emerges in our senses, an image full of hate, blood and bereavement. We must not accept this image and we need to do everything we can to condemn it.

Yitzchak Pass, the child's father, later joined the Bat Ayin Underground terrorist group which planned to blow up a Palestinian girls' school in East Jerusalem. He was eventually arrested and convicted for possession of 10 pounds of explosive, consequently serving a two-year prison sentence.

Media reaction
The Associated Press ran the story with the headline "Jewish toddler dies in West Bank", and was criticized by Joshua Levy in his book The Agony of the Promised Land for downplaying the murder.

The Voice of Palestine, the Palestinian Authority's official radio station, reported that the report of the girl's shooting death was a lie, and that the girl's mother had murdered her own baby.

In popular culture
A song was dedicated to the memory of "Baby Shalhevet", sung by Avraham Fried at a concert in Hebron. The song was written by Fried's brother Rabbi Manis Friedman.

See also
 Deaths of Asher and Yonatan Palmer
 Death of Yehuda Shoham
 Israeli–Palestinian conflict in Hebron
 Murder of Eliyahu Asheri
 Murder of Helena Rapp
 Murders of Koby Mandell and Yosef Ishran
 Murders of Neta Sorek and Kristine Luken
 Murder of Ofir Rahum
 Murder of Hatuel family

References

External links
 Palestinians Kill Baby Girl In West Bank – published on The New York Times on March 27, 2001
 Mourners rage at Shalhevet's funeral – published on The Jerusalem Post on April 2, 2001
 IDF vows to catch Hebron baby-killer – published on The Jerusalem Post on March 28, 2001
 Israeli Ministry of Foreign Affairs profile
 Israeli Department of Education profile - published on education.gov.il
 Critique of original AP report on the incident - published on aish.com

Israeli casualties in the Second Intifada
Deaths by firearm in the West Bank
Terrorism deaths in the West Bank
Terrorist attacks attributed to Palestinian militant groups
People murdered in the Palestinian territories
Israeli murder victims
Terrorist incidents in Hebron
Murdered Israeli children
2001 murders in Asia
Children in war
Terrorist incidents in Israel in 2001
Israeli terrorism victims
Deaths by person in Asia
March 2001 events in Asia
Sniper warfare
Incidents of violence against girls
Female murder victims